Coleophora zelleriella is a moth of the family Coleophoridae. It is found from Sweden to the Mediterranean Sea and from France to southern Russia. It is not known from the Mediterranean islands.

The larvae feed on Salix aurita, Salix caprea and Salix cinerea. They create a black pistol case. The case is covered with grey plant hairs. Larvae can be found from autumn to June.

References

zelleriella
Moths of Europe
Moths described in 1854